Istrian Spring Trophy is a stage road bicycle race held annually in the Croatian part of the Istria peninsula. The race was first organized in 1961 as a small competition reserved to local cyclists. In 2000, it was opened to professional riders; since 2005, it is rated as a 2.2 event on the UCI Europe Tour. Before 2006, the race was called "Jadranska magistrala".

The 2012 edition of the race featured a prologue and three stages totaling , and was contested by more than 200 cyclists from 35 teams.

Winners

References

Sources
 HBS: Pobjednici Jadranske Magistrale. Wayback Archive

UCI Europe Tour races
Cycle races in Croatia
Recurring sporting events established in 1961
1961 establishments in Croatia
Istria
Spring (season) events in Croatia